Florian Gruber (born 26 January 1983 in Vilsbiburg, Lower Bavaria) is a German auto racing driver.

Career
Gruber won Division 2 of the German Touring Car Challenge in 2003, in a Volkswagen Lupo. He moved to the German SEAT Leon Supercopa for 2004, finishing in eighth place. He improved to fourth in 2005, before winning the series in 2006.

He was rewarded for his efforts with a one-off appearance for SEAT Sport during the 2006 World Touring Car Championship season at his home event. He finished in 15th place in both races.

Gruber moved on to the Porsche Carrera Cup Germany in 2007. In 2009 Gruber competed in the FIA GT3 European Championship and ADAC GT Masters.

References

External links
Career statistics at Driver Database

1983 births
Living people
People from Vilsbiburg
Sportspeople from Lower Bavaria
German racing drivers
World Touring Car Championship drivers
Racing drivers from Bavaria
ADAC GT Masters drivers
Nürburgring 24 Hours drivers
Cupra Racing drivers
Porsche Carrera Cup Germany drivers
Volkswagen Motorsport drivers